The 2022 Colorado Senate elections took place on November 8, 2022, with the primary elections held on June 28, 2022. Voters in 17 out of the 35 districts of the Colorado Senate elected their representative for a four-year term. It coincided with other Colorado elections of the same year and the biennial United States elections.

Background
In the previous state Senate election (2020), the Democrats increased their majority to 5 seats. In August 2022, Republican Sen. Kevin Priola announced he was changing his party affiliation to Democratic. Therefore, for Democrats to lose their absolute majority in the Senate in this election, Republicans and other parties would need to gain at least 4 more seats.

This will be the first election with the districts drawn based on the 2020 census. Due to this, some districts do not have incumbents, as they chose to run in other districts that are not up for election in 2022.

Incumbents not seeking re-election 
One Democratic and four Republican incumbents are term-limited and prohibited from seeking a consecutive third term. Under the laws for the state Senate, for terms to be considered non-consecutive, there needs to be a gap of at least 4 years between them.

Democrats 
Retirements
District 11: Pete Lee retired.
District 16: Tammy Story retired to run for state representative from District 25.
District 22: Brittany Pettersen retired to run for U. S. representative from Colorado's 7th congressional district.
Term Limits
District 5: Kerry Donovan retired due to term limits.

Republicans 
Retirements
District 6: Don Coram retired to run for U. S. representative from Colorado's 3rd congressional district.
Term Limits
District 1: Jerry Sonnenberg retired due to term limits.
District 7: Ray Scott retired due to term limits.
District 13: John Cooke retired due to term limits.
District 30: Chris Holbert retired due to term limits, then resigned on May 31, 2022.

Predictions

Results

† - Incumbent not seeking re-election

Italics - Incumbent redistricted to different district

Bold - gain

Closest races 
Seats where the margin of victory was under 10%:
  gain
   
  gain

Detailed Results

District 1

District 3

District 4

District 7

District 8

District 9

District 11

District 15

District 20

District 22

District 24

District 25

District 27

District 30

District 32

District 34

District 35

References

Senate
Colorado Senate elections
Colorado Senate